Park Avenue is a street in New York City.

Park Avenue may also refer to:

Roads
Park Avenue (Montreal), in Quebec, Canada
Park Avenue (Kochi), in India
Park Avenue, Dublin, in Ireland
Park Avenue (Baltimore), in Maryland, U.S.
Park Avenue (Monongahela), in Pennsylvania, U.S.
Park Avenue, a section of Pennsylvania Route 743 in Hershey, Pennsylvania, U.S.

Other uses
Buick Park Avenue, a car named after the Park Avenue in New York
Park Ave., an indie pop band from Omaha
Park Avenue, Aberystwyth, a football ground in Aberystwyth, Wales
Park Avenue Christian Church
Park Avenue Condominiums, a skyscraper in Atlanta, Georgia, United States
Park Avenue (Hong Kong), a private housing estate in Hong Kong
Park Avenue (musical), a 1946 musical
Park Avenue, Queensland, a suburb of Rockhampton, Australia
"Park Avenue" (song), a 1998 single by Girls Against Boys
Park Avenue (stadium), a cricket and football ground in Bradford, England, which lent its name to Bradford Park Avenue A.F.C.
Park Avenue Synagogue, in Manhattan
Park Avenue (teletext soap), a teletext-based soap opera on the ORACLE service from 1988 to 1992
Park Avenue West Tower, a skyscraper in Portland, Oregon
Seventh Regiment Armory or Park Avenue Armory, a building in New York City
Park Avenue: Money, Power and the American Dream, a 2012 political documentary

See also
Park Avenue Historic District (disambiguation)
Park Avenue Line (disambiguation)
Park Avenue Tunnel (disambiguation)
Park Lane (disambiguation)
Park Row (disambiguation)
Park Street (disambiguation)
Parkovy Avenue, in Perm, Russia
 Park Avenue Viaduct, Manhattan